Vitinya Pass is a mountain pass in the Balkan Mountains (Stara Planina) in Bulgaria. It connects Sofia and Botevgrad.

The Hemus motorway passes it in a tunnel just below the summit. The motorway includes a notable girder bridge called the Bebresh Viaduct.

Mountain passes of Bulgaria
Balkan mountains
Landforms of Sofia City Province
Landforms of Sofia Province